The Southeast Yosemite League is a high school athletic league that is part of the CIF Central Section.  The member schools are all public high schools in Bakersfield, California.

Members
 East Bakersfield High School
 Foothill High School
 North High School
 Highland High School
 South High School
 Mira Monte High School

References

CIF Central Section